Gabriela Dabrowski and Mariana Duque were the defending champions, but both players are participating at the 2015 Pan American Games.

Eva Hrdinová and Shahar Pe'er won the tournament, defeating Alona Fomina and Sofiya Kovalets in the final, 6–1, 6–3.

Seeds

Draw

References 
 Draw

Reinert Open - Doubles
2015